Tom Pate Memorial Award, selected annually by the Canadian Football League Players' Association, is awarded to a player with outstanding sportsmanship and someone who has made a significant contribution to his team, his community and Association. The award winner must display these qualities such that it distinguishes him from his peers.

The award is named in the memory of deceased CFL player Tom Pate. A 23-year-old rookie with the Hamilton Tiger-Cats, on October 11, 1975, he was critically injured in a game against the Calgary Stampeders. He never regained consciousness and died three days later.

The award is also known as the CFLPA's Tom Pate Outstanding Community Service Award.

Tom Pate Memorial Award winners

 2022 - Emmanuel Arceneaux (WR), Edmonton Elks
 2021 - Mike Daly (DB), Hamilton Tiger-Cats
 2020 – season cancelled - COVID-19
 2019 - Rob Maver (P), Calgary Stampeders
 2018 - Ryan King (LS), Edmonton Eskimos
 2017 - Adarius Bowman (WR), Edmonton Eskimos
 2016 - Marco Iannuzzi (WR), BC Lions
 2015 - Henry Burris (QB), Ottawa RedBlacks
 2014 - Randy Chevrier (DT), Calgary Stampeders
 2013 - Kyries Hebert (LB), Montreal Alouettes
 2012 - Brian Bratton (WR), Montreal Alouettes
 2011 - Kevin Glenn (QB), Hamilton Tiger-Cats
 2010 - Wes Lysack (DB), Calgary Stampeders
 2009 - Marwan Hage (C), Hamilton Tiger-Cats
 2008 - Jeremy O'Day (C), Saskatchewan Roughriders
 2007 - Milt Stegall (SB), Winnipeg Blue Bombers
 2006 - Mark Washington (DB), BC Lions
 2005 - Danny McManus (QB), Hamilton Tiger-Cats
 2004 - Barron Miles (DB), Montreal Alouettes
 2003 - Steve Hardin (OT), BC Lions
 2002 - Greg Frers (DS), Calgary Stampeders
 2001 - Rick Walters (SB), Edmonton Eskimos
 2000 - Mike Morreale (WR), Hamilton Tiger-Cats
 1999 - Jamie Taras (C), BC Lions

 1998 - Glen Scrivener (DT), Winnipeg Blue Bombers
 1997 - Mark McLoughlin (K), Calgary Stampeders
 1996 - Mike "Pinball" Clemons (RB), Toronto Argonauts
 1995 - Mark McLoughlin (K), Calgary Stampeders
 1994 - O. J. Brigance (LB), Baltimore CFLers
 1993 - Mike "Pinball" Clemons (RB), Toronto Argonauts
 1992 - Danny Barrett (QB), BC Lions
 1991 - Stu Laird (LB), Calgary Stampeders
 1990 - Richie Hall (DB), Saskatchewan Roughriders
 1989 - Matt Dunigan (QB), BC Lions
 1988 - Hector Pothier (OT), Edmonton Eskimos
 1987 - Nick Arakgi (DE), Winnipeg Blue Bombers
 1986 - Tyrone Crews (LB), BC Lions
 1985 - Jerry Friesen (LB), Saskatchewan Roughriders
 1984 - Bruce Walker (WR), Ottawa Rough Riders
 1983 - Henry Waszczuk (C), Hamilton Tiger-Cats
 1982 - David Boone (DE), Edmonton Eskimos
 1981 - Ken McEachern (DB), Saskatchewan Roughriders
 1980 - Jim Coode (OT), Ottawa Rough Riders
 1979 - John Helton (DT), Winnipeg Blue Bombers
 1978 - Pete Mueller (TE), Toronto Argonauts
 1977 - Ron Lancaster (QB), Saskatchewan Roughriders
 1976 - George Reed (RB), Saskatchewan Roughriders

References

Canadian Football League trophies and awards